Otto Riesner (born 29 January 1910, date of death unknown) was a Polish footballer. He played in six matches for the Poland national football team from 1931 to 1935.

References

External links
 

1910 births
Year of death missing
Polish footballers
Poland international footballers
Place of birth missing
Association footballers not categorized by position